Maza of the Moon is a science fiction novel by Otis Adelbert Kline.  It was first published in book form in 1930 by A C McClurg & Co.  The novel was originally serialized in four parts in the magazine Argosy beginning in December 1929.

Plot synopsis
Ted Dustin, an American inventor, seeks to win a prize of one million dollars by being the first person to touch the Moon with an object launched from Earth.  He devises a huge gun, which fires upon the surface of the Moon. Shortly thereafter, the Moon fires back, and war breaks out between the planet and its satellite.  Using a videophone he invented, Ted hails communication with the Moon.  A beautiful woman and her guards first reply, but their transmission is cut off by warlike yellow aliens.  Ted eventually heads to the Moon in a spacecraft of his own design, and meets the titular character, who turns out to be the beautiful woman from the transmission, as well as a princess of one of the two groups that inhabit the Moon.

Publication history
1929, US, Argosy, Pub date December 1929, magazine serialization in 4 parts
1930, US, A. C. McClurg , Pub date 1930, hardback, first book publication

Comic adaptation 
In 1951 Avon Publications published a comic adaptation in Rocket to the Moon, by Walter B. Gibson (script) and Joe Orlando (art).

References

External links

 "The Other Moon Maid, Maza" by Den Valdron, ERBzine, volume 1512.

1930 American novels
1930 science fiction novels
American science fiction novels
Novels first published in serial form
Novels set on the Moon
Works originally published in Argosy (magazine)